Arica Airport  is an airport in Puerto Arica, Colombia.

References

Airports in Colombia